A Praed Street Dossier is a collection of detective fiction short stories, essays and marginalia by author August Derleth.  It was released in 1968 by Mycroft & Moran in an edition of 2,904 copies.  It was an associational collection to Derleth's Solar Pons series of pastiches of the Sherlock Holmes tales of Arthur Conan Doyle.  The two science fiction stories, "The Adventure of the Snitch in Time" and "The Adventure of the Ball of Nostradamus", written with Mack Reynolds, were originally published in The Magazine of Fantasy and Science Fiction.

An earlier edition of the volume was released by Peter Ruber's Candelight Press (1965) as Praed Street Papers. Issued in stiff pictorial wrappers only, with dustjacket, it featured the same Frank Utpatel dustjacket artwork as the later Mycroft & Moran edition.

Contents

A Praed Street Dossier contains the following:

 "The Beginnings of Solar Pons"
 "The Sources of the Tales"
 "Concerning Dr. Parker's Background"
 "The Favorite Pastiches"
 "From the Notebooks of Dr. Lyndon Parker"
 "The Adventure of the Bookseller's Clerk"
 "Solar Pons, Off-Trail"
 "The Adventure of the Snitch in Time" (with Mack Reynolds)
 "The Adventure of the Ball of Nostradamus" (with Mack Reynolds)

Sources

1968 short story collections
Mystery short story collections
Science fiction short story collections by August Derleth
Solar Pons